North American English (NAmE, NAE) is the most generalized variety of the English language as spoken in the United States and Canada. Because of their related histories and cultures, plus the similarities between the pronunciations (accents), vocabulary, and grammar of American English and Canadian English, the two spoken varieties are often grouped together under a single category. Canadians are generally tolerant of both British and American spellings, with British spellings of certain words (e.g., colour) being favored in more formal settings and in Canadian print media; for some other words the American spelling prevails over the British (e.g., tire rather than tyre).  

Dialects of American English spoken by United Empire Loyalists who fled the American Revolution (1775–1783) have had a large influence on Canadian English from its early roots. Some terms in North American English are used almost exclusively in Canada and the United States (for example, the terms diaper and gasoline are widely used instead of nappy and petrol). Although many English speakers from outside North America regard those terms as distinct Americanisms, they are just as common in Canada, mainly due to the effects of heavy cross-border trade and cultural penetration by the American mass media.  The list of divergent words becomes longer if considering regional Canadian dialects, especially as spoken in the Atlantic provinces and parts of Vancouver Island where significant pockets of British culture still remain.

There are a considerable number of different accents within the regions of both the United States and Canada. In North America, different English dialects of immigrants from England, Scotland, Ireland, and other regions of the British Isles mixed together in the 17th and 18th centuries. These were developed, built upon, and blended together as new waves of immigration, and migration across the North American continent, developed new dialects in new areas, and as these ways of speaking merged with and assimilated to the greater American dialect mixture that solidified by the mid-18th century.

Dialects

American English

General American

Ethnic American English
African-American English
African-American Vernacular English
American Indian English
Cajun English
Chicano English
Miami Latino English
New York Latino English
Pennsylvania Dutch English
Yeshiva English

Regional American English
Midland American English
New York City English
Northern American English
Inland Northern American ("Great Lakes") English
New England English
Eastern New England English
Boston English
Maine English
Western New England English
North-Central American ("Upper Midwest") English
Philadelphia English
Baltimore English
Southern American English
Appalachian English
High Tider English
New Orleans English
Older Southern American English
Texan English
Western American English
California English
Pacific Northwest English
Western Pennsylvania ("Pittsburgh") English

Canadian English

Aboriginal Canadian English
Atlantic Canadian English
Lunenburg English
Newfoundland English
Ottawa Valley English
Quebec English
Standard Canadian English

Table of accents

Below, thirteen major North American English accents are defined by particular characteristics:

Phonology

A majority of North American English (for example, in contrast to British English) includes phonological features that concern consonants, such as rhoticity (full pronunciation of all  sounds), conditioned T-glottalization (with satin pronounced , not ), T- and D-flapping (with metal and medal pronounced the same, as ), L-velarization (with filling pronounced , not ), as well as features that concern vowel sounds, such as various vowel mergers before  (so that, Mary, marry, and merry are all commonly pronounced the same), raising of pre-voiceless  (with price and bright using a higher vowel sound than prize and bride), the weak vowel merger (with affected and effected often pronounced the same), at least one of the  vowel mergers (the – merger is completed among virtually all Americans and the – merger among nearly half, while both are completed among virtually all Canadians), and yod-dropping (with tuesday pronounced , not ). The last item is more advanced in American English than Canadian English.

See also
 Belizean English
 Caribbean English
 Commonwealth English
 Comparison of American and British English
 List of American words not widely used in the United Kingdom
 List of words having different meanings in British and American English
 North American French
 North American Spanish
 Regional accents of English

References

Bibliography 
 Chambers, J.K. (1998). "Canadian English: 250 Years in the Making," in The Canadian Oxford Dictionary, 2nd ed., p. xi.
 Clark, Joe (2008). Organizing Our Marvellous Neighbours: How to Feel Good About Canadian English (e-book). .
 

 
18th-century establishments in North America
Languages attested from the 18th century
Dialects of English